The following is a timeline of the history of the city of Wilmington, North Carolina, United States.

18th-19th centuries

 1733 - Settlement "called New Carthage, then New Liverpool, then Newton or New Town."
 1739
 Town incorporated and renamed "Wilmington."
 New Hanover County seat moves to Newton from Brunswick.
 1751 - St. James Episcopal Church founded.
 1756 - Fire.
 1760 - John Sampson becomes mayor.
 1764 - Fort Johnston built near Wilmington.
 1776 - February 27: Battle of Moore's Creek Bridge fought near Wilmington during the American Revolutionary War.
 1781 - Wilmington occupied by British forces under command of Cornwallis.
 1820 - Population: 2,633.
 1830 - Population: 3,791.
 1840 - Population: 5,335.
 1844 - Wilmington Journal newspaper begins publication.
 1849 - April 16: Snowfall.
 1850 - Population: 7,264.
 1855 - Oakdale Cemetery and Wilmington Library Association (social library) organized.
 1860 - Population: 9,552.
 1862 - Yellow fever epidemic empties out city, befalling over 1600 and killing 654.
 1864 - December: Wilmington Campaigns by Union forces begin in area during the American Civil War.
 1865 - February 11–22: Battle of Wilmington fought; Union forces win.
 1866 - City of Wilmington incorporated.
 1867
 Morning Star newspaper begins publication.
 Wilmington National Cemetery established.
 1879 - Africo-American Presbyterian newspaper begins publication.
 1892 - New Hanover County Courthouse built.
 1898 - November: Wilmington insurrection of 1898.

20th century

 1906 - Public library built.
 1915 - Royal Theatre in business.
 1919 - Customs House built.
 1935 - WMFD radio begins broadcasting.
 1947 - University of North Carolina at Wilmington established.
 1954 - WECT (television) begins broadcasting.
 1955 - Starway Drive-In cinema in business.
 1956 - Lower Cape Fear Historical Society formed.
 1966 - Historic Wilmington preservation group founded.
 1971 - February 6: Bombing of grocery store; racial unrest ensues, eventually leading to controversial conviction of "Wilmington Ten."
 1976 - Emsley A. Laney High School established.
 1980 - United States Court of Appeals for the Fourth Circuit overturns "Wilmington Ten" convictions.
 1981 - Athlete Michael Jordan graduates from Laney High School.
 1984 - Italian film producer Dino De Laurentiis opens the De Laurentiis Entertainment Group studios, now part of EUE/Screen Gems.
 1989 - Old New Hanover Genealogical Society formed.
 1997 - Mike McIntyre becomes U.S. representative for North Carolina's 7th congressional district.
 1998 - City website online (approximate date).

21st century

 2003 - Star-News in publication.
 2007 - Bill Saffo becomes mayor.
 2010 - Population: 106,476.
 2015 - David Rouzer becomes U.S. representative for North Carolina's 7th congressional district.
 2018 - Hurricane Florence makes landfall in Wilmington causing major flooding and several deaths

See also
 Wilmington history
 List of mayors of Wilmington, North Carolina
 National Register of Historic Places listings in New Hanover County, North Carolina
 Timelines of other cities in North Carolina: Asheville, Charlotte, Durham, Fayetteville, Greensboro, Raleigh, Winston-Salem

References

Bibliography

 
 . (Includes city history, pp. 9–24)
 
 
 
 
 
 1911 ed., 1920 ed.
 1952 ed., 1963 ed. 
 
 
 
  1957-

External links

  
 Items related to Wilmington, North Carolina, various dates (via Digital Public Library of America)
 

 
Wilmington